Stella Yvette Herrell (born March 16, 1964) is an American politician and realtor who served as the U.S. representative for New Mexico's 2nd congressional district from 2021 to 2023. A member of the Republican Party, she served four terms as a member of the New Mexico House of Representatives for the 51st district from 2011 to 2019.

Herrell was the Republican nominee for New Mexico's 2nd congressional district in 2018, narrowly losing to Democrat Xochitl Torres Small. She was the Republican nominee for the 2nd district again in 2020, and defeated Torres Small in a rematch. She lost her bid for reelection in 2022 to Democratic nominee Gabe Vasquez.

Herrell has marked many firsts: she is the first Republican Native woman elected to Congress, the first Cherokee woman, the third Native American woman, and the second Native woman from New Mexico elected to the House. She was the only Republican member of New Mexico's congressional delegation during the 117th Congress.

Early life and education 
Herrell was born in Ruidoso, New Mexico, and is a citizen of the Cherokee Nation. After attending Cloudcroft High School, she earned a legal secretary diploma from the ITT Technical Institute School of Business in Boise, Idaho.

After graduating from ITT, Herrell returned to New Mexico, where she worked as a realtor in Alamogordo. She later worked as a real estate broker for Future Real Estate in Alamogordo.

New Mexico House of Representatives 

In 2010, Herrell challenged incumbent District 51 Republican state Representative Gloria Vaughn in the June 1 Republican primary. Herrell won with 846 votes (54.2%), and went on to win the November 2 general election with 3,077 votes (62.9%) against Democratic nominee Susan Medina.

In 2012, Herrell was unopposed in both the June 5 Republican primary, which she won with 2,128 votes, and the November 6 general election, which she won with 7,750 votes.

U.S. House of Representatives

Elections

2018 

In 2018, Herrell was a candidate for the United States House of Representatives, and was defeated in a close race by political newcomer and Democratic attorney Xochitl Torres Small. The results were close on election night, with Herrell in the lead at the end of the night and some New Mexico media organizations projecting that she would win. The next day, more ballots were counted, narrowing Herrell's lead, and media organizations rescinded their initial projections. Absentee ballots made Torres Small the winner. Without offering evidence, Herrell alleged possible election fraud before conceding the race.

A 2018 Associated Press review of Herrell's campaign finance disclosure records found that she had failed to disclose that her real estate company earned $440,000 in contracts with two state agencies over five years. Herrell said she had submitted all required paperwork and that the allegations against her represented "an attack on my moral character" orchestrated by one of her opponents in the Republican congressional primary.

2020 

Herrell was a candidate for the 2nd congressional district in the 2020 elections. In the Republican primary, she faced businesswoman Claire Chase and businessman Chris Mathys. Herrell won the primary with 45.6% of the vote and faced Torres Small in the November general election.

Herrell won the November general election and took office on January 3, 2021. She campaigned on a stronger southern U.S. border, supporting small businesses, and fighting overly tight government regulation.

2022 

Herrell was a candidate for the 2nd congressional district in the 2022 elections. She ran unopposed in the Republican primary and faced Democratic nominee Gabe Vasquez in the general election.

Vasquez won the November general election in a tight race.

Tenure

Veterans
Herrell voted against the PACT Act, intended to improve healthcare access and funding for veterans who were exposed to toxic substances during military service.

Infrastructure 
Herrell voted against the Infrastructure Investment and Jobs Act.

Defense
In June 2021, Herrell was one of 49 House Republicans to vote to repeal the AUMF against Iraq.

In September 2021, Herrell was among 75 House Republicans to vote against the National Defense Authorization Act of 2022, which contains a provision that would require women to be drafted.

Immigration
In 2021, Herrell called for the National Guard to be deployed at the United States-Mexico border.

In 2022, Herrell was the main sponsor of a bill to give Canadian truckers protesting vaccine mandates temporary political asylum.

Committee assignments
 Committee on Natural Resources
 Subcommittee on Energy and Mineral Resources
 Subcommittee on National Parks, Forests and Public Lands
 Committee on Oversight and Reform
 Subcommittee on Environment
 Subcommittee on Government Operations
Source

Caucus memberships
 Freedom Caucus
 Republican Study Committee

Electoral history

2018

2020

2022

Political positions 
During her campaign for the 2nd district in 2020, Herrell positioned herself as an ally of President Donald Trump. After Joe Biden won the 2020 presidential election and Trump refused to concede while making baseless claims of fraud, Herrell objected to the certification of Arizona's and Pennsylvania's electoral votes in Congress.

Herrell supports repealing the Affordable Care Act. She has argued that health insurance should be left to "free markets".

In an interview with the Albuquerque Journal, she said, "DACA needs to be reformed." She also said she "will not support any legislation that will impede on our Second Amendment" and supports allowing concealed carry on school property.

Herrell opposes abortion. While a member of the New Mexico House of Representatives in 2015, Herrell sponsored a bill that banned late-term abortion with exceptions for instances of sexual abuse, rape, or incest.

She has said that the federal government's role in public education should be limited.

Herrell has said that she supports legislation that improves water rights, private property rights, and the management of public lands.

After Trump supporters stormed the U.S. Capitol on January 6, 2021, Herrell voted not to impeach Trump.

In 2021, Herrell voted against the American Rescue Plan that was passed by Congress and signed into law by Biden.

On February 25, 2021, Herrell voted against the Equality Act, a bill that would prohibit discrimination based on gender identity and sexual orientation by amending the Civil Rights Act of 1964 and the Fair Housing Act to include new protections.

During the COVID-19 pandemic, Herrell attended events that did not comply with public health measures to hinder the spread of the virus, such as social distancing and face masks. Explaining why she did not wear a face mask while in a public gathering, Herrell said, "I was at an event, yes; no one in the audience was wearing a mask, so I didn't feel as though I needed to wear one in that particular setting." She criticized the virus mitigation strategies implemented by Democrats in New Mexico.

Personal life
Herrell is a Protestant Christian.

See also
List of Native Americans in the United States Congress
Women in conservatism in the United States
Women in the United States House of Representatives

References

External links

Official page at the New Mexico Legislature

Yvette Herrell at Ballotpedia
Yvette Herrell at the National Institute on Money in State Politics

|-

1964 births
20th-century American businesswomen
20th-century American businesspeople
21st-century American women politicians
21st-century American politicians
20th-century Native American women
20th-century Native Americans
21st-century Native American women
21st-century Native Americans
American Protestants
American real estate brokers
Businesspeople from New Mexico
Candidates in the 2018 United States elections
Candidates in the 2020 United States elections
Cherokee Nation members of the United States House of Representatives
Christians from New Mexico
Female members of the United States House of Representatives
Living people
Republican Party members of the New Mexico House of Representatives
Native American women in politics
Native American Christians
People from Ruidoso, New Mexico
Protestants from New Mexico
Republican Party members of the United States House of Representatives from New Mexico
Women state legislators in New Mexico